Lorenzo Sonego defeated defending champion Laslo Đere in the final, 2–6, 7–6(7–5), 6–4 to win the men's singles title at the 2021 Sardegna Open. With the victory, Sonego became the first Italian in 15 years to capture an ATP Tour title on home soil.

Seeds
The top four seeds received a bye into the second round.

Draw

Finals

Top half

Bottom half

Qualifying

Seeds

Qualifiers

Qualifying draw

First qualifier

Second qualifier

Third qualifier

Fourth qualifier

External links
 Main draw
 Qualifying draw

2021 ATP Tour
2021 Singles